Andrei Sidorenkov (born 12 February 1984) is an Estonian former professional footballer who played as a left-back.

Club career
Sidorenkov began his career in Estonia and played for Narva Trans, Sillamäe Kalev, Tulevik, Tervis Pärnu and Flora.

He joined Danish Superliga side SønderjyskE on 31 August 2008 and left the club when his three-year contract ran out after the 2010–11 season. He then had a trial at Polish Ekstraklasa club Widzew Łódź, but did not get a contract offer there. In September of the same year Sidorenkov signed a three-month contract with Danish side Viborg, saying the club had potential to pursue promotion. He rejected an extension offer and left the club in late December. In February of the next year he took part in Dinamo București's training camp in Turkey, but left the club without a contract. Later that month he returned to Denmark and signed a 1,5-year contract with Fredericia on 27 February.

International career
Sidorenkov is a member of the Estonian national team with 23 appearances and no goals for the country. He scored an own goal against Slovenia in a UEFA Euro 2012 qualification match on 12 October 2010, giving Slovenia a 1–0 win as it remained the only goal of the match.

Honours

Club
Flora
 Meistriliiga: 2002
 Estonian Cup: 2007–08
 Estonian Supercup: 2002

References

External links

Official Danish Superliga Stats

1984 births
Living people
Sportspeople from Sillamäe
Estonian people of Russian descent
Estonian footballers
Association football defenders
Estonia international footballers
Estonian expatriate footballers
Expatriate men's footballers in Denmark
Expatriate footballers in Belarus
Expatriate footballers in Norway
Estonian expatriate sportspeople in Denmark
Estonian expatriate sportspeople in Belarus
Estonian expatriate sportspeople in Norway
JK Narva Trans players
JK Sillamäe Kalev players
FC Flora players
Viljandi JK Tulevik players
JK Tervis Pärnu players
SønderjyskE Fodbold players
Viborg FF players
FC Fredericia players
FC Gomel players
Nõmme Kalju FC players
Nybergsund IL players
Tallinna JK Legion players